The Order of Quetzalcoatl, colloquially known as the "Q", is a Masonic invitational body.  It is heavily involved in philanthropy, and its main contribution is towards transportation funds for Shriners hospitals.

The Order, which was founded in Mexico City on March 14, 1945 by Arthur J. Elian, takes its name from the Aztec god Quetzalcoatl.  Its chapters (called Teocallis, Nahuatl for "house of god") are located in the United States, Canada, Mexico, and Panama.  All members of the Order, called Artisans, must be Shriners in good standing in their Shrine Temples.

The Order derives its terminology from Nahuatl, and its rituals are loosely based on Aztec ritual, including the use of the teponaztli war drum and the sacred drink, pulque.

The order consists of an initiation (Coate) and two degrees (Artisan and Master Artisan). A candidate becomes a Coate when he is initiated into the order. Then he becomes an Artisan through a ritual ceremony. He may then advance to Master Artisan either through consecration ceremonies at the order’s annual business meeting (called a Feast of Fire) or through traveling to either the Temple of Quetzalcoatl at Teotihuacan in Mexico City or Chichen Itza in Cancun.

References

External links
Official Website of the governing body
Lore and History, Truth and Fiction from phoenixmasonry.org

Shriners
Organizations based in Mexico City
1945 establishments in Mexico
Freemasonry in Mexico